Cotton candy, also known as  fairy floss and  candy floss, is a spun sugar confection that resembles cotton. It usually contains small amounts of flavoring or food coloring.

It is made by heating and liquefying sugar, and spinning it centrifugally through minute holes, causing it to rapidly cool and re-solidify into fine strands. It is often sold at fairs, circuses, carnivals, and festivals, served in a plastic bag, on a stick, or on a paper cone.

It is made and sold globally, as candy floss in the UK, Ireland, Egypt, India (also known as grandma's hair), New Zealand, Sri Lanka, and South Africa; as "girls hair" in United Arab Emirates, and Saudi Arabia; and as fairy floss in Australia. Similar confections include Korean  and Persian .

History 

Several sources track the origin of cotton candy to a form of spun sugar found in Europe in the 19th century. At that time, spun sugar was an expensive, labor-intensive endeavor and was not generally available to the average person. Others suggest versions of spun sugar originated in Italy as early as the 15th century.

Machine-spun cotton candy was invented in 1897 by dentist William Morrison and confectioner John C. Wharton, and first introduced to a wide audience at the 1904 World's Fair as Fairy Floss with great success, selling 68,655 boxes at 25¢ ($ today) per box. On September 6, 1905, Albert D. Robinson of Lynn, Massachusetts submitted his patent for an Electric Candy-Spinning Machine, a combination of an electronic starter and motor-driven rotatable bowl that maintained heating efficiently. By May 1907, he transferred the rights to the General Electric Company of New York. His patent remains today as the basic cotton candy machine.

Joseph Lascaux, a dentist from New Orleans, Louisiana, invented a similar cotton candy machine in 1921. His patent named the sweet confection "cotton candy", eventually overtaking the name "fairy floss", although it retains this name in Australia. In the 1970s, an automatic cotton candy machine was created which made the product and packaged it, making it easier to produce at carnivals, stalls and other events requiring more portable production.

Tootsie Roll Industries, the world's largest cotton candy manufacturer, makes a bagged, fruit-flavored version called Fluffy Stuff.

In the United States, National Cotton Candy Day is celebrated on December 7.

Production 

Typical machines used to make cotton candy include a spinning head enclosing a small "sugar reserve" bowl into which a charge of granulated, colored sugar (or separate sugar and food coloring) is poured. Heaters near the rim of the head melt the sugar, which is squeezed out through tiny holes by centrifugal force. Colored sugar packaged specially for the process is milled with melting characteristics and a crystal size optimized for the head and heated holes; granulated sugar used in baking contains fine crystals which spin out unmelted, while rock sugar crystals are too large to properly contact the heater, slowing the production of cotton candy.

The molten sugar solidifies in the air and is caught in a larger bowl which totally surrounds the spinning head. Left to operate for a period, the cotton-like product builds up on the inside walls of the larger bowl, at which point machine operators twirl a stick or cone around the rim of the large catching bowl, gathering the sugar strands into portions which are served on stick or cone, or in plastic bags. As the sugar reserve bowl empties, the operator recharges it with more feedstock. The product is sensitive to humidity, and in humid summer locales, the process can be messy and sticky.

Modern innovations in cotton-candy equipment include vending machines which automatically produce single servings of the product, developed in Taiwan and lighted or glowing sticks.

Flavoring 

The source material for candy mesh is usually both colored and flavored. When spun, cotton candy is white because it is made from sugar, but adding dye or coloring transforms the color. Originally, cotton candy was just white. In the US, cotton candy is available in a wide variety of flavors, but two flavor-blend colors predominate—blue raspberry and pink vanilla,  both originally formulated by the Gold Medal brand (which uses the names "Boo Blue" and "Silly Nilly"). Cotton candy may come out purple when mixed. Cotton candy machines were notoriously unreliable until Gold Medal's invention of a sprung base in 1949—since then, they have manufactured nearly all commercial cotton candy machines and much of the cotton candy in the US.

Typically, once spun, cotton candy is only marketed by color. Absent a clear name other than "blue", the distinctive taste of the blue raspberry flavor mix has gone on to become a compound flavor that some other foods (gum, ice cream, rock candy, fluoride toothpaste) occasionally borrow ("cotton-candy flavored ice cream") to invoke the nostalgia of cotton candy. The sale of blue cotton candy at fairgrounds in the 1950s is one of the first documented instances of blue-raspberry flavoring in America. Pink bubble gum went through a similar transition from specific branded product to a generic flavor that transcended the original confection, and "bubble gum flavor" often shows up in the same product categories as "cotton candy flavor".

Machines 
In 1978, the first automated machine was used for the production of cotton candy. Since then, many variants have appeared, ranging in size from counter-top to party- and carnival-size.

See also 

 Candy making
 Dragon's beard candy

References

Further reading 
 The Complete Confectioners, Pastry, Cook and Baker by M. Sanderson (Philadelphia: Lippincott)
 "History of Cotton Candy" . Cotton Candy Express. N.p., n.d. Web. September 14, 2011.

External links 
 

American inventions
Amorphous solids
Desserts
Food and drink introduced in 1897
Sugar confectionery